Wanigela Airport  is an airport in Wanigela, a village in the Oro Province (also known as Northern Province) in Papua New Guinea.

History
The airfield was built by Australia New Guinea Administrative Unit authorities in July 1942 during World War II. Consisting of a single grassed runway, it was used primarily for transport flights.

Airlines and destinations
The following airlines offer scheduled passenger service from this airport:

References

Airports in Papua New Guinea
Oro Province